Franklin Township may refer to:

 Franklin Township, Clare County, Michigan
 Franklin Township, Houghton County, Michigan
 Franklin Township, Lenawee County, Michigan

See also 
 Franklin, Michigan, a village in Oakland County

Michigan township disambiguation pages